Pleasants House is a historic home located at Amagansett in Suffolk County, New York. It was built in the late 1860s and is a two-story frame residence with a three bay central block, side and rear wings, gable roofs, and front porches.

It was added to the National Register of Historic Places in 1984.

References

Houses on the National Register of Historic Places in New York (state)
Houses completed in 1860
Houses in Suffolk County, New York
National Register of Historic Places in Suffolk County, New York
1860s establishments in New York (state)